Crooked Little Vein is the first novel by established comic book writer Warren Ellis, published by William Morrow on July 24, 2007.

The novel is written in the first-person, similar to much of the hardboiled detective genre. The book was based on research material posted on Ellis' websites, mostly odd news items and disturbing pictures from the web that the author had found or had been sent.

The novel has been translated into Spanish, German, French, Czech, and Italian.

Plot summary
Michael McGill, a burned-out private eye is hired by a corrupt, heroin-addicted White House Chief of Staff to find a second "secret" United States Constitution, which had been lost in a whorehouse by Richard Nixon. What follows is a scavenger hunt across America, exposing its seedier side along the way. McGill is joined by a college student, Trix, who is writing a thesis on sexual fetishes.

McGill has to deal with strange events sometimes unrelated to his adventures – he describes himself as a 'shit-magnet', with weird phenomena following him wherever he goes.

Critical reception 
About.com reviewer Jonathan Lasser called Crooked Little Vein "an ace put-up job" and wrote that it was "evidence that freedom is more valuable than repression".

Whitney Pastorek, reviewing for Entertainment Weekly takes pains to note that the work "is not for the faint of heart", and that Ellis has "got a bright future outside of the picture books".

References

External links
 Chapter 1 of Crooked Little Vein available from amazon.com (pdf).
 Sample chapter (Ch. 16) of Crooked Little Vein posted by Ellis to his Livejournal account.

Interviews
 Interview with Warren Ellis at Newsarama
 Interview at Publishers Weekly

2007 British novels
Novels by Warren Ellis
American thriller novels
William Morrow and Company books
2007 debut novels